Little Diamond Peak, at  above sea level, is a mountain in the Lemhi Range of Idaho, United States. The peak is located in Butte County on the border of Caribou-Targhee National Forest and Salmon-Challis National Forest. It is the 68th highest peak in Idaho.

References 

Caribou-Targhee National Forest
Mountains of Butte County, Idaho
Mountains of Idaho
Salmon-Challis National Forest